Sucrose octapropionate is a chemical compound with formula  or , an eight-fold ester of sucrose and propionic acid. Its molecule can be described as that of  sucrose  with its eight hydroxyl groups – replaced by propionate groups –.  It is a crystalline colorless solid.  It is also called sucrose octapropanoate or octapropionyl sucrose.

History
The preparation of sucrose octapropionate was first described in 1933 by Gerald J. Cox and others.

Preparation
The compound can be prepared by the reaction of sucrose with propionic anhydride in the melt state or at room temperature, over several days, in anhydrous pyridine.

Properties
Sucrose octapropionate is only slightly soluble in water (less than 0.1 g/L) but is soluble in many common organic solvents such as isopropanol and ethanol, from which it can be crystallized by evaporation of the solvent.

The crystalline form melts at 45.4–45.5 °C into a viscous liquid (47.8 poises at 48.9 °C), that becomes a clear glassy solid on cooling, but easily recrystallizes. 

The density of the glassy form is 1.185 kg/L (at 20 °C).  It is an optically active compound with [α]20D +53°.

The compound can be vacuum distilled at 280–290 °C and 0.05 to 0.07 torr.

Applications
Distillation of fully esterified propionates has been proposed as a method for the separation and identification of sugars.

While the crystallinity of the pure compound prevents its use as a plasticizer it was found that incompletely esterified variants (with 1 to 2 remaining hydroxyls per molecule) will not crystallize, and therefore can be considered for that application.

See also
 Sucrose octaacetate

References 

Disaccharides
Bitter compounds
propionate esters